Don Wilson Padgett (December 5, 1911 – December 9, 1980) was an American professional baseball player, a catcher/outfielder for the St. Louis Cardinals (1937–41), Brooklyn Dodgers (1946), Boston Braves (1946) and Philadelphia Phillies (1947–48). He attended Lenoir-Rhyne College.

Padgett's professional career stretched from 1935 through 1951. From 1942 to 1945 Padgett served in the United States Navy during World War II.

In , Padgett — while serving as backup catcher to Cardinals receiver Mickey Owen — batted a lofty .399 in 92 games played, 257 plate appearances and 233 at bats, but did not qualify for the National League batting championship.  All told, in eight Major League seasons he played in 699 games and had 1,991 At Bats, 247 Runs, 573 Hits, 111 Doubles, 16 Triples, 37 Home Runs, 338 RBI, 6 Stolen Bases, 141 Walks, .288 Batting Average, .336 On-base percentage, .415 Slugging Percentage, 827 Total Bases and 10 Sacrifice Hits.

Padgett died in High Point, North Carolina, four days after his 69th birthday.

References

Sources

1911 births
1980 deaths
United States Navy personnel of World War II
Baseball players from North Carolina
Boston Braves players
Brooklyn Dodgers players
Columbus Red Birds players
Houston Buffaloes players
Major League Baseball catchers
Major League Baseball right fielders
Minor league baseball managers
Oakland Oaks (baseball) players
People from Caroleen, North Carolina
Philadelphia Phillies players
St. Louis Cardinals players
Salisbury Pirates players